The Hampshire County Division was a short-lived formation of the British Army, located  in South East England on the coast of the English Channel. It was raised in the Second World War and was formed on 28 February 1941 by the redesignation of Hampshire Area. On 25 November the division ceased to function and the headquarters was disbanded on 31 December. It was commanded by Major-General G. J. P. St. Clair and was an infantry only formation consisting of one Independent Infantry Brigade (Home) and three sub areas from the Hampshire area. Combat support, artillery, engineers etc., would be provided by other local formations. and served under V Corps.

Order of Battle
The brigade served with the division from its formation until 30 November 1941.

 214th Independent Infantry Brigade (Home)
 6th Battalion, The Oxfordshire and Buckinghamshire Light Infantry (left 26 November 1941)
 19th Battalion, The Royal Fusiliers
 20th Battalion, The Royal Fusiliers
 21st Battalion, The Royal Fusiliers (left 15 July 1941)
 11th Battalion, The West Yorkshire Regiment (joined 15 July, left 26 November 1941)
 11th Battalion, The Hampshire Regiment (joined 13 November 1941)
 12th Battalion, The Hampshire Regiment (joined 25 November 1941)

The brigade would join the 47th (London) Infantry Division.

See also

 List of British divisions in World War II

References

Bibliography

 

British county divisions
Military units and formations established in 1941
Military units and formations disestablished in 1941
Organisations based in Hampshire
Military units and formations of the British Empire in World War II